Microtenucha is a monotypic moth genus in the family Thyrididae first described by William Warren in 1900. Its only species, Microctenucha munda, was first described by George Hampson in 1893.

Its wingspan is 30 mm.

Distribution
It is found in Sikkim, India.

Biology
Known host plants of this species are Litsea glutinosa and Neolitsea zeylanica (Lauraceae).

References
Warren, 1900. New genera and species of Drepanulidae, Thyrididae, Epiplemidae, and Geometridae.

Thyrididae
Monotypic moth genera